The Plug Uglies were an American Nativist criminal street gang, sometimes referred to loosely as a political club, that operated in the west side of Baltimore, Maryland, from 1854 to 1865. The Plug Uglies gang name came from the enormous oversized plug hats they stuffed with wool and leather, pulling them down over their ears for head protection as primitive helmets when going into gang battles. Also, the term plug ugly was used to identify an extremely tough ferocious fighter who could give a sound beating to an opponent. The name Plug Uglies was used to refer to a number of criminal gangs in New York City as well as Philadelphia.

The Plug Uglies took part in the 1856 Baltimore Know-Nothing Riot. They allied themselves with the New York City Irish Dead Rabbits gang in looting New York City during the American Civil War in the Draft Riots of 1863. However, this latter alleged association is disputed, as the Plug Uglies, a Nativist gang, were anti-Irish.

History
The Plug Uglies coalesced in the 1850s shortly after the creation of the Mount Vernon Hook-and-Ladder Company, a Baltimore Fire Department volunteer fire company located in the Mount Vernon area. They were originally runners and rowdies affiliated with Mount Vernon. Plug Ugly captains included John English and James Morgan. Other prominent members were Louis A. Carl, George Coulson, George "Howard" Davis, Henry Clay Gambrill, Alexander Levy, Erasmus "Ras" Levy, James Wardell, and Wesley Woodward. The gang associated with the emerging American Party, also known as the Nativist Know Nothings, in Baltimore.

Like similar associations in Baltimore and other U.S. cities during this period, the Plug Uglies' street influence made them useful to party politicians anxious to control the polls on election days. The Plug Uglies were the central figures in the first election Know-Nothing Riot in Baltimore in October 1855. Together with the Rip Raps, they were also actively involved in deadly rioting at the October 1856 municipal election in Baltimore and in similar violence at the Know-Nothing Riot in Washington, D.C., in June 1857. At the Washington riot, the National Guard was called out to quell the fighting. Accounts of the Washington riot appeared in newspapers nationally and gained widespread notoriety for the Plug Uglies.

Besides election-day fighting, the gang was involved in several assassinations and shootings in Baltimore. Most notably, Plug Ugly Henry Gambrill was implicated in the murder of a Baltimore police officer in September 1858. Gambrill's trial (presided over by judge Henry Stump) and the subsequent deadly violence relating to it, made the crime one of the most sensational of the era.

The violence of the Plug Uglies and other political clubs had an important impact on Baltimore. It was largely responsible for the creation of modern policing and a paid, professional fire department, as well as court and electoral reforms. These reforms, together with the election of a Reform municipal administration in October 1860 and then the Civil War, led to the breaking up of the Plug Uglies.

The Plug Uglies were featured in Herbert Asbury's book Gangs of New York, and Lucy Sante's chronicle of old New York, Low Life.  They are also mentioned in Chapter XIII of MacKinlay Kantor's Pulitzer Prize-winning novel "Andersonville" (1955).

On July 16, 1863, during the New York City draft riots, The New York Times reported that Plug-Uglies and Bloody Tubs gang members from Baltimore, as well as the Philadelphia Schuykill Rangers under Jimmy Haggerty and other rowdies of Philadelphia," had come to New York to participate in the riots alongside the Dead Rabbits and other New York gangs. The Times said that "the scoundrels cannot afford to miss this golden opportunity of indulging their brutal natures, and at the same time serving their colleagues the Copperheads and secesh [secessionist] sympathizers."

See also
List of historical gang members of New York City

Notes

References
Haskins, James., Street Gangs, New York: Hastings House, 1974.
Sifakis, Carl. The Encyclopedia of American Crime (3rd ed.). New York: Facts on File Inc., 2005.
Tracy Matthew Melton, Hanging Henry Gambrill: The Violent Career of Baltimore's Plug Uglies, 1854–1860 (2005).

Further reading
Kobler, John., Capone: The Life and World of Al Capone. New York: J.P. Putnam's Sons, 1971.
Peterson, Virgil., The Mob: 200 Years of Organized Crime in New York. Ottawa, Illinois: Green Hill, 1983.
Sante, Luc, Low Life: Lures and Snares of Old New York (1991)
Tyler Anbinder, Five Points: The 19th Century New York City Neighborhood That Invented Tap Dance, Stole Elections, and Became the World's Most Notorious Slum (2001).

External links
The Legend of Old Smoke Morrissey by John William Tuohy

Former gangs in Baltimore
Culture of Baltimore
 
Former gangs in New York City